The 2025 Virginia lieutenant gubernatorial election will be held on November 4, 2025, to elect the Lieutenant Governor of Virginia. Incumbent Republican Lieutenant Governor Winsome Sears is eligible to run for re-election to a second term in office.

Republican convention

Candidates

Potential
Winsome Sears, incumbent Lieutenant Governor (2022–present)

Democratic primary

Candidates

Potential 
Joshua Throneburg, cleaning company owner and nominee for Virginia's 5th congressional district in 2022

References 

Lieutenant Governor
2025
Virginia